Bethanie Mattek-Sands and Sania Mirza were the defending champions, but Mattek-Sands chose not to participate this year. Mirza played alongside Martina Hingis and successfully defended her title, defeating Caroline Garcia and Kristina Mladenovic in the final, 1–6, 7–5, [10–5].

Seeds

Draw

References 
 Draw

W